Sommarpratarna is a Swedish television series at Sveriges Television. The series had its premiere on 10November 2009 and has been broadcast every year since. It features the celebrity guests of the radio show Sommar i P1.

References

Sveriges Television original programming